Badger Trust, formerly the National Federation of Badger Groups (NFBG), is an animal welfare charity operating in England and Wales.  It states that it is the leading voice for badgers and that its charitable aim is to promote and enhance the welfare, conservation and protection of badgers, their setts and their habitats.   It represents around sixty local badger groups dedicated to the conservation and protection of the European badger.

The trust campaigns against badger culling in the United Kingdom. The trust filed legal challenges in the High Court against planned badger culls, challenging a planned cull in Wales in 2010. The Trust won a temporary halt to the Welsh cull. In 2012, the Trust's lawyers sent a 16-page legal letter to Natural England, which licensed a badger cull, calling upon the agency to stop a planned cull in Gloucestershire and Somerset; in 2014, the Trust filed a challenge in High Court to this planned cull. This challenge was unsuccessful. In 2016, the Badger Trust spoke out against plans to expand badger culling to five new areas in South West England; the group's chief executive said that the four years of badger culling had "been a disastrous failure on scientific, cost and humaneness grounds" and called for a halt.

In 2014, the group issued a report about illegal snaring and hunting of badgers in Britain.  Badger Trust sees campaigning around crimes against badgers as a key area of focus and calls for increased sentences to five years, in line with crimes against domestic animals.  

Local Badger Groups are the direct action side of the Badger Trust. There are around 50 local voluntary Badger Groups in England, Wales and Northern Ireland.

References

External links
Official website

Animal welfare organisations based in the United Kingdom
Badgers
Wildlife Trusts of the United Kingdom